Goldberg or Goldberger may refer to:

Arts and entertainment 
 Goldberg Ensemble, a British string ensemble
 Goldberg Variations, a set of 30 keyboard variations by Johann Sebastian Bach
 The Goldbergs (broadcast series), American radio and television comedy-drama series
 The Goldbergs (2013 TV series), a 2013 American situation comedy
 Maximum Destruction, a monster truck driven by Tom Meents that was originally named for Bill Goldberg

Companies 
 Goldbergs, a British department store group that ceased trading in 1991
 Carl Goldberg Products, an American manufacturer of radio-controlled airplane kits
 Spelling-Goldberg Productions, an American television production company

People 
 Goldberg (surname), people with the surname Goldberg
 Bill Goldberg, a professional wrestler also known simply as Goldberg

Places 
 Goldberg, Germany
 Złotoryja, Poland

Science 
 Goldberg reaction, in chemistry
 Goldberg–Sachs theorem, a theorem in general relativity
 Goldberg system, a system of plant taxonomy
 Goldberger–Wise mechanism, in particle physics
 Goldberg polyhedron, in mathematics
 Goldberg test, for psychiatric screening

Other 
 Goldberg Horror Award, an annual literary award named for D. G. K. Goldberg
 Goldberg machine, any complex apparatus that performs a simple task in an indirect and convoluted way
 Goldberg Magazine, a Spanish-based publication devoted to early and Baroque music
 Goldberg v. Kelly, a 1970 United States Supreme Court case regarding due process
 Rostker v. Goldberg, a 1981 United States Supreme Court case regarding women in the military

See also 
 Goldberg Variations (disambiguation)
 Goldbergturm
 Goldenberg